Francesco Buzzurro (born October 7, 1969, in Taormina, Italy) is an Italian guitarist.

Biography
Buzzurro began studying classical guitar at the age of six. He earned a diploma from the Bellini Conservatory in Palermo, and later obtained a Master of Advanced Music from the International Arts Academy in Rome. There he was taught by musicians such as Stefano Palamidessi, David Russell, Alberto Ponce, Hopkinson Smith, and John Duarte.

Career

He writes music for theater and television and appears on radio and television programs.

Indiana Productions, owners of Muccino-Brothers, chose the music of Buzzurro for the film Io ricordo.

 2010: Received a prize from Italian President Giorgio Napolitano for the music in the docufilm Io ricordo
 2009: Triquetra, from the Region of Sicily
 2009: Groove Master Award prize a Francesco Buzzurro, perché "nell'ambito del groove e del contemporary jazz è riuscito ad offrire una nuova visione musicale, completata da una tecnica unica al mondo".
 2008: Efebo D’Oro prize for the music in the film Io ricordo.

Discography

Francesco Buzzurro Quartet
Francesco Buzzurro: guitar; Mauro Schiavone: piano & keyboards; Riccardo Lo Bue: basso; Sebastiano Alioto:batteria
 1998 – Latinus (Teatro del Sole)
 2006 – Naxos (Mare Nostrum)
Francesco Buzzurro solo guitar
 2002 – Freely (Teatro del Sole)
 2009 – L'Esploratore (Lo Faro/Irma Records-Edel)

References

External links 
 Francesco Buzzurro on MySpace

1969 births
Living people
People from Taormina
20th-century guitarists
21st-century guitarists
Bossa nova guitarists
Italian jazz guitarists
Italian male guitarists
20th-century Italian male musicians
21st-century Italian male musicians
Male jazz musicians
Musicians from Sicily